This is a list of films that deal with the topic of race or racism.
(*) mark are documentary films.

1910's

United States

1915
The Birth of a Nation
1916
Intolerance
1919
Broken Blossoms (1 remake: UK, 1936)

1920's

United States

1920
In the Depths of Our Hearts

1930's

United States

1930
Son of the Gods
1936
Show Boat
1939
Gone With the Wind
Marian Anderson: The Lincoln Memorial Concert*

Other Countries
Triumph of the Will (Germany, 1935)
Circus (USSR, 1936)

1940's

United States

1942
In This Our Life
1943
Hitler's Children
1947
Crossfire
Gentleman's Agreement
1949
Home of the Brave 
Lost Boundaries
Pinky

Other Countries
The Eternal Jew (Germany, 1940)
Jud Süß (Germany, 1940)
Angelitos negros (Mexico, 1948) (1 remake: Mexico, 1970)

1950's

United States

1950
The Jackie Robinson Story
No Way Out
1951
Go for Broke!
The Well
1952
Japanese War Bride
Toxi
1954
Salt of the Earth
1955
Bad Day at Black Rock
1956
Giant
1957
Edge of the City
Island in the Sun
Sayonara
1958
The Defiant Ones
The Mark of the Hawk (US/UK)
1959
Come Back, Africa (South Africa/US)
The Crimson Kimono
The Cry of Jazz*
The Hate That Hate Produced* TV
Imitation of Life
Odds Against Tomorrow
Shadows
Shock Corridor

Other Countries
Cry, the Beloved Country (UK, 1951)
Native Son (Argentina, 1951)
Mulata (Mexico, 1954)
Yambaó (México/Cuba, 1957)
Black Orpheus (Brazil/France/Italy, 1959)
Kiku to Isamu (Japan, 1959)
Sapphire (UK, 1959)

1960's

United States

1960
All the Young Men
Sergeant Rutledge
The Unforgiven
1961
Bridge to the Sun (France/US)
Paris Blues
A Raisin in the Sun (1 remake: 2008 TV)
West Side Story (1 remake: 2021)
1962
The Intruder
Pressure Point
To Kill a Mockingbird
1963
Free, White and 21
Gone Are the Days!
Shock Corridor
1964
Black Like Me
Nothing But a Man
One Potato, Two Potato
1965
Mississippi: A Self Portrait* TV
A Patch of Blue
1966
Lost Command
A Man Called Adam
A Time for Burning*
1967
Guess Who's Coming to Dinner (1 remake: 2006)
Hurry Sundown
In the Heat of the Night (2 sequels: 1970, 1971)
The Story of a Three-Day Pass
1968
Black Panthers* (France/US)
Finian's Rainbow (Ireland/US)
The Heart Is a Lonely Hunter
Planet of the Apes (filmseries)
1969
Change of Mind
The Learning Tree

Other Countries
Flame in the Streets (UK, 1961)
The Human Pyramid (Ivory Coast, 1961)
The Battle of Algiers (Italy/Algeria, 1966)
Fair Wind, "Blue Bird"! (Soviet Union/Yugoslavia, 1967)
To Sir, with Love (UK, 1967)
Death By Hanging (Japan, 1968)
Story of a Three Day Pass (France, 1968)
Blood of the Condor (Bolivia, 1969)
Katrina (South Africa, 1969)
Medea (Italy/France/West Germany, 1969)

1970's

United States

1970
The Eye of the Storm* TV (1 sequel: 1985 TV)
The Great White Hope
Is It Always Right to Be Right?
The Landlord
...tick...tick...tick...
Watermelon Man
1971
Brian's Song TV
Brother John
Shaft (filmseries)
Vanishing Point (1 remake: 1997 TV)
1972
Buck and the Preacher
The Final Comedown
Lady Sings the Blues
Sounder (1 sequel: 1976)
Stigma TV
1973
Coffy
The Spook Who Sat by the Door
1974
The Autobiography of Miss Jane Pittman TV
Blazing Saddles
Conrack
1975
The California Reich*
Coonskin
Mandingo (1 sequel: 1976)
1976
Deadly Hero
Nightmare in Badham County TV
1977
Greased Lightning
1978
The Boys from Brazil (UK/US)
Lawman Without a Gun TV
1979
I Know Why The Caged Bird Sings TV
Undercover with the KKK
Wilmington 10 -- U.S.A. 10,000*

Other Countries
Soleil O (Mauritania/France, 1970)
Fist of Fury (Hong Kong, 1972)
Fantastic Planet (FR/CZ, 1973)
Ali: Fear Eats the Soul (West Germany, 1974)
Chronicle of the Years of Fire (Algeria, 1975)
The Common Man (France, 1975)
The Wilby Conspiracy (UK, 1975)
Albino (West Germany/UK/South Africa/Rhodesia, 1976)
Pressure (UK, 1976)
Game for Vultures (UK, 1979)

1980's

United States

1981
Crisis At Central High TV
Lion of the Desert (Libya/US)
Ragtime
1982
A House Divided: Denmark Vesey's Rebellion TV
The Klan: A Legacy of Hate in America*
Midnight
Miles of Smiles, Years of Struggle*
Twilight Zone: The Movie
White Dog
1984
The Cotton Club
The Killing Floor TV
Places in the Heart
A Soldier's Story
The Times of Harvey Milk*
1985
And The Children Shall Lead TV
The Color Purple
1986
Native Son
Resting Place TV
Soul Man
Wildcats
1987
Ethnic Notions* (1 sequel: 1992*)A Gathering of Old Men TVWho Killed Vincent Chin?*1988Alien Nation (franchise)BetrayedBirdColorsFor Queen and Country (UK/US)HairsprayMississippi BurningSchool DazeStand and DeliverTalk Radio1989Dead BangDo the Right ThingDriving Miss DaisyA Dry White Season (US/France)GloryLean on MeLethal Weapon 2The Lunch DateMy Past Is My Own TVOther CountriesManganinnie (Australia, 1980)Speak White* (Canada, 1980)Gandhi (UK/India, 1982)Made in Britain TV (UK, 1982)Pink Floyd – The Wall (UK, 1982)Bread TV (Israel, 1986)Cry Freedom (UK/Zimbabwe, 1987)Blind Justice (UK, 1988)A World Apart (UK/Zimbabwe, 1988)
1990's
United States
1990Come See the ParadiseThe Long Walk HomeMurder in Mississippi TVQ & ASudie and Simpson TV1991Blood in the Face*Boyz n the HoodBrother Future TVFried Green TomatoesJungle FeverMississippi Masala (UK/US)Paris Trout TV1992Candyman (film series)Imagining Indians*Incident at OglalaLove FieldMalcolm XThe Power of One (France/Germany/Australia/US)Sarafina (US/South Africa/UK/France)School TiesWhite Men Can't JumpZebrahead1993Amos & AndrewA Bronx TaleClass of '61 TVCombination PlatterThe Ernest Green Story TVMenace II SocietySankofa (Burkina Faso/Germany/Ghana/US/UK)Schindler's List1994Assault at West Point: The Court-Martial of Johnson Whittaker TVCorrina, CorrinaForrest GumpThe Glass ShieldThe Shawshank RedemptionWhitewash TV1995Cry, the Beloved Country (South Africa/US)Dangerous MindsDevil in a Blue DressA Father for Charlie TVHigher LearningThe Infiltrator TVJefferson in Paris (FR/US)The Journey of August KingLosing IsaiahPocahontasThe Shadow of Hate*Tales from the Hood (2 sequel: 2018, 2020)Top DogThe Tuskegee Airmen TVThe Walking DeadWhite Man's Burden1996The ChamberDon't Be a Menace to South Central While Drinking Your Juice in the HoodA Family ThingGet On The BusGhosts of MississippiThe Hunchback of Notre DameMr. and Mrs. Loving TVNightjohn TVSoul of the Game TVA Time To KillThe Watermelon Woman19974 Little Girls*AmistadBuffalo Soldiers TVHope TVMandela and de Klerk TVMiss Evers' Boys TVThe PostmanRosewood1998Ambushed TVAmerican History XApt PupilBelovedThe Farm: Angola, USA*PariahRuby Bridges TV1999Chasing Secrets, or The Secret Path TVCrazy in AlabamaA Day in Black and WhiteThe Green MileHaving Our Say: The Delany Sisters' First 100 Years TVThe HurricaneI'll Remember AprilIntroducing Dorothy Dandridge TVA Lesson Before Dying TVLifeOur Friend, MartinPassing GlorySelma, Lord, Selma TVSnow Falling On CedarsSouth Park: Bigger, Longer & UncutSummer's End (Canada/US)
Other Countries
1991The Leader, His Driver and the Driver's Wife* TV (South Africa/UK) (1 sequel: UK, 2006* TV)Xuong rong den (Vietnam)
1992Minoru: Memory of Exile* (Canada)Once Upon a Time in China (China)Romper Stomper (Australia)Speak It! From the Heart of Black Nova Scotia* (Canada)
1993For Angela (Canada)Moving the Mountain* (Canada)Schwarzfahrer (Germany)Speak Up! It's So Dark (Sweden)
199530:e november (Sweden)Hearts of Hate* TV (Canada)
1996Blue Eyed* (Germany)The Road Taken* (Canada)Taxi (Spain)
1997La vita è bella (Italy)Nattbuss 807 (Sweden)
1998Head On (Australia)
1999East Is East (UK)Flores de otro mundo (Spain)Ichigensan (Japan)Unwanted Soldiers* TV (Canada)

2000's
United States
2000BamboozledThe Color of Friendship TV (US/Canada)Finding ForresterFreedom Song TVFrom Swastika to Jim Crow*Men of HonorRemember the TitansRoads and BridgesA Storm in Summer TVTwo Family House2001The Believer Bojangles TVBoycott TVThe Feast of All Saints TVFocusMonster's BallNiggas' RevengeRuby's Bucket of Blood TVScottsboro: An American Tragedy*200210,000 Black Men Named George TVThe Bronze Screen: 100 Years of the Latino Image in Hollywood*Far from Heaven (US/France)Hart's WarKeep The Faith Baby TVThe Rosa Parks Story TVSins of the Father TV2003Bringing Down the HouseDeacons For Defence TVJasper, Texas TVMendez vs. Westminster: For All the Children*The Murder of Emmett Till* TV2004Crash (US/Germany)A Day Without a Mexican (US/Mexico/Spain)Harold & Kumar Go to White Castle (franchise)Hiding and Seeking* TVHotel Rwanda  (US/UK/South Africa/Italy)The N-Word*RaySomething The Lord Made TV2005500 Years Later*AnimalMan-Thing (US/Australia)Neo NedUnforgivable Blackness: The Rise and Fall of Jack Johnson* TVThe Untold Story of Emmett Louis Till*2006Amazing Grace (UK/US)AmericaneseBorat: Cultural Learnings of America for Make Benefit Glorious Nation of Kazakhstan (US/UK)Flags of Our FathersGlory RoadHeavens FallMirrors of Privilege: Making Whiteness VisibleReel Bad Arabs*The Slanted Screen*Something New2007Banished*Below the Fold*Brick by Brick: A Civil Rights Story* TVDescentFreedom WritersThe Great DebatersHairspray (US/UK)Namibia: The Struggle for Liberation (Namibia/US)PrideSteel Toes (Canada/US)Talk To Me20084Chosen: The Documentary*The Bank Job (US/UK/Australia)Beautiful Me(s): Finding Our Revolutionary Selves*The Express: The Ernie Davis StoryGospel HillLakeview TerraceNeshoba*The Order of Myths*The Secret Life of Bees2009The Blind SideChristmas in Canaan (US/Canada)Gran TorinoInglorious Bastards (US/Germany)Invictus (South Africa/US)Maafa 21*Prom Night in Mississippi*Soundtrack for a Revolution* (US/FR/UK)Vincent Who?*Other Countries
2000Give Us Our Skeletons* (Norway)Lumumba (France/Belgium/Germany/Haiti)Saroja (Sri Lanka)
2001Khaled (Canada)Too Colourful for the League* TV (Canada)
2002Je me souviens* (Canada)The Pianist (France/Germany/Poland/UK)Little Angel (Sri Lanka)Rabbit-Proof Fence (Australia)
2003Décryptage* (France)Le silence de la forêt (Central African Republic/Cameroon/Gabon/France)Louis and the Nazis* TV (UK)The Zone* (Sweden)
2004Being Osama* (Canada)Continuous Journey* (Canada)The Football Factory (UK)I – Proud to Be an Indian (India)Red Dust (UK/South Africa)
2005Gypo (UK)Manderlay (Various Countries)
2006Africa Paradis (France/Benin)Brocket 99: Rockin' the Country* (Canada)Days of Glory (France/Morocco/Belgium/Algeria)Heart of Whiteness (South Africa)This Is England (UK)United Gates of America* TV (UK)
2007Goal (India)Mississippi Cold Case* TV (Canada)Nazi Pop Twins* TV (UK)Unrepentant: Kevin Annett and Canada's Genocide* (Canada)
2008Skin (UK/South Africa)
2009Cedar Boys (Australia)The Combination (Australia)Endgame (UK)London River (UK/France)Mighty Jerome* (Canada)Mugabe and the White African* (UK)Reel Injun* (Canada)

2010's
United States
2010Blood Done Sign My NameFor Colored GirlsMy Name Is Khan (India/US/Hong Kong)Night Catches UsNo Crossover: The Trial of Allen Iverson*Yellow Face*2011Dark Girls* TVThe Double Conscious: Race & Rhetoric*The Help (US/India/United Arab Emirates)Hidden Colors* (4 sequels: 2012*, 2014*, 2016*, 2019*)The Loving Story*2012Booker's Place: A Mississippi Story*Cloud Atlas (Germany/US)Cracking the Codes: The System of Racial InequityDeepsouth*Django UnchainedLincolnThe Paperboy201312 Years a Slave (US/UK/Canada)42Betty and Coretta TVThe ButlerFruitvale StationHate CrimeInappropriate ComedyLatinos Beyond Reel*The RetrievalSavannahTula: The Revolt20149-Man*Black Sea (UK/US)Cesar Chavez (Mexico/US)Dear White PeopleDiamond in the Dunes* TVForgotten Four: The Integration of Pro Football* TVFreedomThe Gabby Douglas Story TVGet On UpHate Crimes in the Heartland* TVPlanes: Fire and RescueSelma (UK/US)SupremacyTake Me to the River*White ChicksYou Belong to Me: Sex, Race and Murder in the South*2015Bars4Justice*Bessie TVChi-RaqDriving While BlackGet HardHogtownLast Day of Freedom* TVRosenwald*Straight Outta ComptonWelcome to Leith*What Happened, Miss Simone?* TVWhite People* TVWoodlawn201613th*All The Way TVAn American Girl Story – Melody 1963: Love Has to WinAmerican PastoralBarry TVThe Birth of a NationFencesFree State of JonesHidden FiguresHillary's America: The Secret History of the Democratic Party*I Am Not Your Negro* (Germany/US)In the Hour of Chaos*LBJLoving (UK/US)MoonlightThe North StarStay Woke: The Black Lives Matter Movement* TVA United Kingdom (Czech Republic/France/UK/US)Zootopia2017Birth of a Movement*Bright TVA Change of HeartThe Chinese Exclusion Act* TVDetroitDid You Wonder Who Fired the Gun?*Get OutHidden FiguresThe King*Kings (France/Belgium/US)LA 92* TVMarshallMudboundMy Nephew EmmettRodney KingThe Shape of WaterSuburbicon2018Black, White & Blue*BLACKkKLANSMANBurdenDeath of a Nation*Fahrenheit 11/9*Green BookHale County This Morning, This Evening*The Hate U GiveIf Beale Street Could TalkKing in the Wilderness*Matangi/Maya/M.I.A.* (UK/US)SkinSkin2019American Son  TVThe Best of EnemiesCanal StreetCuckHarrietHello, Privilege. It's Me, Chelsea* TVJojo Rabbit (US/New Zealand/Czech Republic)Just MercyA Love Song for Latasha* TVLuceMaMiss VirginiaThe Obituary of Tunde JohnsonQueen & SlimSee You Yesterday TVTraveling While Black* (Canada/US)I Am Not a RacistOther Countries
2010Crook (India)Frankie and Alice (Canada)He's on Duty (South Korea)Skinning (Serbia)
2011The Black Power Mixtape 1967–1975* (Sweden)From C to C: Chinese Canadian Stories of Migration* TV (Canada)Winnie Mandela (South Africa/Canada)
20123D Stereo Caste* (India)Hold Back (France)The Sapphires (Australia)Toussaint Louverture (France)
2013Belle (UK)Heart of a Lion (Finland)ID–WithoutColors* (Germany)Mandela: Long Walk to Freedom (UK/South Africa)The Marchers (France/Belgium)Utopia* TV (Australia)
2014Serial (Bad) Weddings (France) (1 sequel: /Belgium, 2019)We Are Young. We Are Strong (Germany)
2015French Blood (France)The Hard Stop* (UK)The Man Who Knew Infinity (UK)Ninth Floor* (Canada)The Pass System* (Canada)
2016Amerika Square (Greece)Chocolat (France)Kalushi (South Africa)Race (Canada/France/Germany)
2017An Act of Defiance (Netherlands/South Africa)Black Cop (Canada)The Forgiven (UK)Jasper Jones (Australia)Silent Nights (Denmark)Sweet Country (Australia)White Right: Meeting the Enemy* TV (UK)
2018Black Is Beltza (Spain)Black Sheep* (UK)Farming (UK)The Nightingale (Australia)Pariyerum Perumal (India)Slam (Australia/France)
2019Asuran (India) (1 remake: India, 2021)Axone (India)Blinded by the Light (UK)Ip Man 4: The Finale (Hong Kong/China)The Last Victims (South Africa)There's Something in the Water* (Canada)White Eye (Israel)

2020's
United States
2020The 24thAggie*The BankerCoded Bias*A Crime on the Bayou*Da 5 BloodsSon of the SouthTwo Distant Strangers2021Attica* TVBlack Seeds: The History of Africans in America* TVKarenSummer of Soul*Who We Are: A Chronicle of Racism in America2022MasterEmergencyTillThe WalkBowl Game Armageddon (2023 film)Other CountriesBlack Bodies (Canada, 2020)Colour Photo (India, 2020)Corona (Canada, 2020)Coronavirus (India, 2020)The Odd-Job Men (Spain/France, 2021)
 The Survival of Kindness'' (Australia, 2023)

See also 
Films about race
Lists of films
List of films featuring colonialism
List of films featuring slavery
List of hood films
List of skinhead films
Political cinema
Racism in horror films
Whitewashing in film
Propaganda film
Racism in early American film
Race movie
Blaxploitation
L.A. Rebellion
Antisemitism
White supremacy
Genocide
Hate crime
Civil rights
Inequality in Hollywood
Magical Negro
White savior narrative in film

References

Notes

External links 
 Teachers Against Prejudice recommended films

Racism
Films about race and ethnicity
 List
Racism